The M1128 Mobile Gun System (MGS) is an eight-wheeled armored car of the Stryker armored fighting vehicle family, mounting a 105 mm tank gun, based on the Canadian LAV III light-armored vehicle manufactured by General Dynamics Land Systems for the U.S. Army. 

The MGS program emerged after the 1996 cancelation of the Army's M8 Armored Gun System, the service's planned replacement for the M551 Sheridan light tank.

The MGS was procured in limited numbers. It will be retired by the end of 2022 due to design and operational deficiencies.

History

Background: Replacing the Sheridan

Following the end of the Cold War some theorists believed that the existing suite of U.S. armored vehicles, designed largely to fight Soviet mechanized forces in Europe, were not well suited to the lower-intensity missions U.S. armed forces would be tasked with. 

This led to the development of a new armored fighting vehicle designed for lower-intensity combat, rather than large-scale battle.

By 1992, the Armored Gun System emerged as a top priority procurement program for the Army. The Army requested proposals for a 20-ton air-droppable light tank to replace the M551 Sheridan. The Army sought 300 AGS systems to go to the 82nd Airborne Division and the 2nd Armored Cavalry Regiment. Four competitive bids emerged. 

In June 1992, the Army selected the FMC Close Combat Vehicle, Light proposal. This was later type-classified as the  M8 Armored Gun System. In 1996, the Army canceled the AGS due to the service's budgetary constraints.

Interim Armored Vehicle competition

The General Dynamics Mobile Gun System originated from the Canadian Armoured Combat Vehicle requirement. In partnership with General Motors, General Dynamics Land Systems (GDLS)–Canada integrated its Low Profile Turret (LPT) onto a LAV III in January 1999. The turret was an updated version of the one used on the GD–Teledyne Expeditionary Tank, which was entered into the Armored Gun System competition in the 1980s. 

In October 1999, U.S. Army Chief of Staff Eric Shinseki laid out his vision for a lighter, more transportable force. He called for mid-weight brigades that would strike a balance between heavy armor and infantry. The Army subsequently launched the Interim Armored Vehicle acquisition program. One of the required vehicles was the Mobile Gun System (MGS).

A team of GM Defense of Canada and GDLS submitted a variant of the LPT Assault Gun to meet the MGS requirement. General Dynamics was responsible for most of the MGS. United Defense LP proposed an M8 Armored Gun System (AGS) and two variants of the Mobile Tactical Vehicle Light (MTVL), one with the AGS turret and 105mm gun, and another with a 90mm gun. Two other competing contractors submitted bids for infantry carriers, but declined to submit offers for the MGS requirement.

Unlike the infantry carrier variant, MGS prototypes were not evaluated on the Army's proving grounds. This resulted in protests from lawmakers and industry officials. The service maintained that bid samples would be unnecessary and complicate the competition.

In September 2000, the Army told bidders it was considering plans to increase by 200 the number of MGS units purchased. Though the service did not say why it was interested in more MGS units, however Defense Daily speculated that the Army could equip light divisions with the MGS.

In November 2000, GM–GDLS won the contract for both the infantry carrier and MGS. The MGS was later type classified as the M1128. GM–GDLS was forced to suspend work on the IAV while the Government Accounting Office evaluated UDLP's protest of the award. GAO denied the protest in April 2001.

Further development and initial production 
Soon after the contract was awarded, the MGS IOC date slipped two years from December 2001 to November 2003. The Army allowed GM–GDLS to substitute the Stryker ATGM variant for the MGS in the interim. In its protest, UDLP alleged that the Army had known about the schedule slippage before awarding the contract, and unfairly disregarded this in their decision making.

GDLS delivered the first of eight pre-production Mobile Gun Systems in July 2002.

In March 2004, the Army approved the transfer of four AGS production vehicles to the 82nd Airborne Division to be used in Iraq. In June 2004, this plan was put on hold while the Army determined whether the MGS could meet the 82nd's requirements. In August, the Army conducted an air-drop test of a Stryker M1132 Engineer Squad Vehicle weighted to simulate the load of the MGS. Around the same time, the Army identified issues with the air-dropability of the MGS, among the heavier of the Stryker family. Still more pervasive problems persisted with the autoloader. 

In January 2005, the Army said it had ruled out fielding the AGS, saying the system lacked a spare parts inventory that would be required to maintain the vehicle for any significant length of time. The Army doubled down on its belief in the MGS, which it said it could begin fielding in summer 2006.

In October 2004, the Pentagon approved limited low-rate production of the MGS after a Defense Acquisition Board review. During limited production, 14 vehicles were produced. During this time, General Dynamics redesigned the ammunition handling system to be more reliable. In November 2004, the Pentagon approved an Army request to move the vehicle into low-rate production, to a  total of 72 vehicles.

On February 2008, the Pentagon approved full-rate production of the MGS after a Defense Acquisition Review. The Army chose to defer production of new vehicles while it waited to validate fixes made to the MGS.

In 2010, GDLS began incorporating explosive reactive armor on MGS production units.

Full-rate production was indefinitely deferred in 2012.

In late 2013, the U.S. Army began seeking to reintroduce an airdroppable mobile airborne protected firepower platform to provide fire support for air assault forces, a capability that had been absent since the retirement of the M551 Sheridan in 1997. General Dynamics initially considered modifying the wheeled Stryker MGS to meet the Mobile Protected Firepower (MPF) program requirement, but the company instead entered a variant of the Griffin light tank.

As of May 2016, 3 Mobile Gun Systems had been written off during combat operations out of 142 produced.

Retirement
In May 2021, the Army announced they would divest all Mobile Gun Systems by the end of 2022. The decision was made following an analysis that found its autoloader had become expensive to maintain and that the M1128 had not been upgraded with a Double V-Hull. It was more efficient to eliminate the platform and focus on firepower improvements such as equipping Strykers with 30 mm cannons and CROWS-J mounts, providing better distributed lethality capabilities that will not be lost from removing the MGS.

Foreign interest 
Canada had liquidated about half of its fleet of Leopard 1 main battle tanks in the early 2000s. The Canadian Army planned to replace the MBTs with 66 Mobile Gun Systems. However in 2007, the Canadian Army reversed itself and decided instead to procure Leopard 2s.

Combat use
The Mobile Gun System saw service in the Iraq War and the War in Afghanistan.

Design

Armor and protection
The MGS has integral all-around armor protection against 14.5 mm AP rounds.

The MGS commander and gunner are located in the turret basket, which provides the crew some separation from the ammunition in the event of an explosion. According to a Government Accounting Office report released in May 2001, the Army had expressed doubt that this arrangement would provide "any protection from secondary explosions and fires from the main gun ammunition."

Firepower

The MGS's low profile turret has a small silhouette, is stabilized and mounts a 105mm M68A1E4 rifled cannon with a fume extractor and an autoloader. The vehicle is primarily outfitted to support infantry combat operations. While it could take on some of the roles of a tank, it is not primarily intended or designed to engage in combat with main battle tanks.

The MGS can store 18 rounds of main gun ammunition: 8 in the autoloader's carousel and 10 in a replenisher located at the rear of the vehicle. It has a rate of fire of ten rounds per minute.

The MGS was originally developed for the Canadian Army, which did not have a requirement for transporting the vehicle via C-130. The U.S. Army did have this requirement, and so a design change was required to lower the MGS's height so that the vehicle could fit inside the aircraft. The turret was lowered within the hull. This change caused problems of its own. The reduced distance between the muzzle brake and the hull caused blast overpressures to develop. A solution was found where the "pepper pot" could be covered by a sheet of metal.

The MGS's 105 mm cannon can fire four types of ammunition: the M900 kinetic energy penetrator to destroy armored vehicles; the M456A2 high-explosive anti-tank round to destroy thin-skinned vehicles and provide anti-personnel fragmentation; the M393A3 high-explosive squash head plastic round to destroy bunkers, machine gun and sniper positions, and create openings in walls for infantry to access; and M1040 canister shot for use against dismounted infantry in the open.

In 2001, Rheinmetall announced that it was seeking to incorporate its 105 mm smoothbore low recoil gun on the MGS around 2004. The Army had not articulated such a requirement.

By 2000, the Army found its existing ammunition stockpile of 105 mm rounds to be in poor condition, with more than half determined to be either unusable or obsolete. The Army solicited industry to produce new ammunition to replenish the stockpile. L3 Communications completed low rate production of M393 high-explosive plastic HEP-T and M467 training rounds in 2004. 10,000 combat and 18,400 training rounds were ultimately produced by L3.

Secondary armament
The coaxial weapon is an 7.62 mm caliber M240 machine gun. The commander's weapon is a 7.62 mm caliber machine gun in a skate mount. Alternately an M2 Browning .50 caliber machine gun or a 40 mm Mk 19 grenade launcher can be mounted.

Differential attributes and failures 
Because the vehicle was originally designed without air conditioning (A/C), crews were given cooling vests that circulate cooled water from outside the vehicle to the garment. Vehicle computers still overheated regularly. All MGS Stryker platforms have since been upgraded with A/C units. The large weapon station and relatively smaller hatch can make emergency exits difficult. 

The main cannon is separate from the crew compartment. A gun stoppage during combat can be cleared only by exiting the vehicle.

M1128 suffered of lack of reliability, excessive dead space, gun size and gun control issues, taking its development to a limited production in 2010 with 142 units in service.

Organization
As originally projected the U.S. Army allocated nine Mobile Gun Systems (3 per infantry company) to a battalion, making for 27 Mobile Gun Systems per "Stryker brigade" in 2013, but later the Army cut the number per brigade to 10. 

As of May 2017, a Stryker brigade combat team is equipped with three platoons of MGS Strykers and three platoons of ATGM Strykers in its weapons troop.

The Army purchased 142 Mobile Gun Systems in total. Three were lost in combat. The Army planned to authorize 32 Mobile Gun Systems to a Stryker Brigade Combat Team (BCT). However due to the low numbers produced, only nine were allocated to a BCT.

A three-vehicle MGS platoon operates organic to a Stryker infantry company, with one MGS in support of a Stryker infantry platoon.

See also
 AMX-10 RC
 AMOS
 B1 Centauro
 LAV-600
 Rooikat
 ZTL-11
 Type 16 maneuver combat vehicle
 M1134 Anti-Tank Guided Missile Vehicle, a Stryker tank destroyer variant
 M8 Armored Gun System, a U.S. Army light tank acquisition program canceled in 1996
 MGM-166 LOSAT, a canceled U.S. Army line-of-sight missile
 Mobile Protected Firepower, an ongoing U.S. Army light tank acquisition program
 XM1202 Mounted Combat System, a U.S. Army Future Combat Systems 20-ton tank canceled in 2011
 XM1219 Armed Robotic Vehicle, a U.S. Army Future Combat Systems unmanned ground combat vehicle canceled in 2011

References

External links

Autoloaders
Fire support vehicles
Assault guns
Post–Cold War armored fighting vehicles of the United States
Armoured fighting vehicles of Canada
General Dynamics land vehicles
Wheeled armoured fighting vehicles
Military vehicles introduced in the 2000s
Mowag Piranha